This is a list of notable Nagpuri films produced in the Nagpuri language.

1990s

2000s

2010s

2020s

See also
Nagpuri cinema

References

Nagpuri
Nagpuri-language films
Cinema of Jharkhand
Nagpuri
Nagpuri language